North Murray High School is a high school located in Chatsworth, Murray County, Georgia, United States. It is part of the Murray County School System.

North Murray's mascot is the Mountaineer, and North Murray is the only high school in Georgia to have that mascot. The school colors are black and gold. North Murray High School offers many athletic programs, career pathways, and a host of clubs and extracurricular activities.

Athletics Director is Steve Granger, the head football coach is Coach Preston Poag, and the offensive coordinator for football is Cody Rainey. The head boys' basketball coach is Tim Ellis, the head girls' basketball coach is Randy Watson, the track coach is Kyle Trego, the field Coach is Jacob Ledford, and the head golf coach is Cody Rainey. Seth Hickman coaches baseball, and the head softball coach is Steve Granger. Amanda Bynum is the head tennis coach, Matt Chambers coaches North Murray's boys soccer team, and Rolando Ambriz coaches North Murray's girls soccer team.

In 2012, the Mountaineer archery team won the school's first state championship.

In 2016, the Mountaineer football team made the state playoffs for the first time in school history, with a record of 9–3.

Notable alumni 
 Ladd McConkey - wide receiver for the Georgia Bulldogs

References

External links 
 North Murray High School website

Public high schools in Georgia (U.S. state)
Schools in Murray County, Georgia
2010 establishments in Georgia (U.S. state)